Castleberry Hill is a neighborhood in Atlanta, Georgia, adjacent to and southwest of Downtown Atlanta. It is a federally recognized historic district since 1985 and became a City of Atlanta Landmark District in 2006.

History
The area in the city limits of Atlanta known today as Castleberry Hill was originally part of the renegade Snake Nation community that functioned during the 1850s.  According to an article from Atlanta Magazine, Castleberry Hill was, by the mid-nineteenth century, a red-light district filled with prostitutes, gambling, and cockfighting.  By the time the Civil War began, however, this area was in the process of industrialization.  Items such as terra cotta and other building materials were produced then in Atlanta factories.  Additionally, Castleberry Hill then contained cotton warehousing and grocers.  One of those grocers was Daniel Castleberry, for whom the area was named. Daniel Castleberry, however, is believed to have been an established businessman in the area as a result of his winning the land in the 1821 Georgia Land Lottery. By the early 1990s, the area had fallen on hard times, serving as the backdrop for dystopic films such as Freejack and Kalifornia.  Loft conversions began in the 1980s, and by 1992, there were 120 lofts with 150 residents. The 1996 Olympics saw another influx of development. By the early 21st century, however, Castleberry Hill began another renaissance with major motion pictures and TV series such as Walking Dead' being filmed in the area; the now well-known Castleberry Hill Art Stroll, which is held on the second Friday of each month, has become yet another popular event in this area. Castleberry Hill is noted for having the largest concentration of black owned businesses in the nation.

Gallery

References

External links

 Atlanta, Georgia, a National Park Service Discover Our Shared Heritage Travel Itinerary

Historic districts on the National Register of Historic Places in Georgia (U.S. state)
Neighborhoods in Atlanta
Arts districts
National Register of Historic Places in Atlanta